Florian Fricke (23 February 1944 – 29 December 2001) was a German musician who started his professional career with electronic music using the Moog synthesizer within the krautrock group Popol Vuh. His music and that of the band however  soon evolved in a completely different direction, and he almost completely abandoned synthesizers in favor of the acoustic piano.

History
Born in Lindau am Bodensee, Germany on 23 February 1944, Fricke started playing piano as a child. He studied piano, composition and directing at the Conservatories in Freiburg and Munich. It was in Munich that, at 18, he dedicated himself to new kinds of music like free jazz. He also filmed some short amateur films. (He would later become a movie and music critic for the German magazine Der Spiegel and the Swiss paper Neue Zürcher Zeitung). It was also in Munich that he met Gerhard Augustin, who for many years would be his producer.

In 1967 he met German film director Werner Herzog and the two formed a lifelong friendship. Fricke played a role in his first movie Lebenszeichen (1968). Fricke was later responsible for the soundtracks of several of Herzog's movies, among them Nosferatu: Phantom der Nacht (with Klaus Kinski and Bruno Ganz), Aguirre, the Wrath of God and Heart of Glass. Fricke also made a cameo appearance in Herzog's Jeder für sich und Gott gegen alle (1974).

Fricke was one of the first musicians to own and use a Moog III synthesizer, with which he recorded Popol Vuh's first two albums Affenstunde and In den Gärten Pharaos. His recordings with the instruments left an indelible mark on German electronic music. However, he later significantly sold his Moog to fellow German musician Klaus Schulze and largely renounced electronic music in favor of often-acoustic tones.

In 1970, together with Holger Truelzsch and Frank Fiedler, he founded the group Popol Vuh. The name is taken from a Mayan manuscript (see "Popol Vuh"). Fricke was the leader of the group until his death, almost always together with guitarist and drummer Daniel Fichelscher. Fricke also recorded an album of Mozart compositions.

Besides working on his own music, Fricke collaborated with many German musicians. In 1972 he played on Tangerine Dream's Zeit double album and collaborated with Renate Knaup of Amon Düül II. Together with Fichelscher, from 1973 to 1974 he was a member of former Popol Vuh guitarist Conny Veit's band Gila. In 1992 he recorded an album of Mozart compositions. In 1998 he organized audio/video installations, among them "Messa di Orfeo" in the Italian city of Molfetta. 
Beginning in the 1970s, Fricke dedicated himself to musicotherapy. He also developed an original form of therapy called the "Alphabet of the Body".

Together with former Popol Vuh member Frank Fiedler, who was a competent cameraman, Fricke produced a series of films of spiritual inspiration set in the Sinai desert, Israel, Lebanon, Mesopotamia, Morocco, Afghanistan, Tibet and Nepal.

Fricke died of a stroke in Munich in 2001, at the age of 57.

In October 2003 Klaus Schulze wrote:
"Florian was and remains an important forerunner of contemporary ethnic and religious music. He chose electronic music and his big Moog to free himself from the restraints of traditional music, but soon discovered that he didn't get a lot out of it and opted for the acoustic path instead. Here, he went on to create a new world, which Werner Herzog loves so much, transforming the thought patterns of electronic music into the language of acoustic ethno music."

Florian Fricke solo albums
Die Erde und ich sind Eins ("The Earth and I Are One", 1983) – limited private pressing
Florian Fricke Plays Mozart (1992) – featuring Fricke on piano playing Mozart compositions

For his albums with Popol Vuh, see Popol Vuh.

References

External links
 
 Popol Vuh Reference Comprehensive article & review of every album, in English
 Interview with Florian Fricke
 Popol Vuh.nl, Dutch site in English
 Popol Vuh.it, Italian site in Italian and English

1944 births
2001 deaths
German electronic musicians
German composers
20th-century German pianists
Krautrock
People from Lindau
20th-century German musicians